Toni Suuronen (born 30 June 1995) is a Finnish ice hockey forward currently playing for KooKoo of the Finnish Liiga.

References

External links
 

1995 births
Living people
Lukko players
Finnish ice hockey forwards
KeuPa HT players
KooKoo players
People from Hamina
Sportspeople from Kymenlaakso